Figures all precede the 2022 Russian invasion of Ukraine

* - Donetsk Oblast and Luhansk Oblast without part of separatist territories, since 2014 forming self-proclaimed Donetsk People's Republic and Luhansk People's Republic.

See also
Pensions in Ukraine
Unemployment benefits in Ukraine
List of Ukrainian administrative divisions by GRP per capita (in $US)

References
 Average wage by regions in 2009. State Statistics Committee of Ukraine 
 Average wage by regions in 2013. State Statistics Committee of Ukraine 
Average monthly salary by regions of Ukraine in March 2021

Economy of Ukraine-related lists
Ukraine
Salary